Dr Brown, Doctor Brown or Doc Brown may refer to:

 Doc Brown (dancer), ragtime dancer, famous for "Doc Brown's Cakewalk"
 Doc Brown (rapper) (Ben Harvey Bailey Smith, born 1977), British rapper, comedian, actor, screenwriter and voiceover artist
 Emmett Brown, also known as "Doc Brown", a character in the Back to the Future series of films
 Dr. Brown's, a soft drink
 Doctor Brown, a song by J. T. Brown and Buster Brown, later covered by Fleetwood Mac on Mr. Wonderful
 Edwin J. Brown, also known as "Doc Brown", mayor of Seattle from 1922 to 1926

Physicians and people with doctorates called Brown
Alan A. Brown (1928–2010), American professor of Economics
Ann Brown (1943–1999), educational psychologist
David Brown (pharmacology professor), British professor of Pharmacology
David Brown (geneticist) (born 1968), American scientist
Dennis Brown (academic), American professor of Medicine
Dorothy Lavinia Brown (1919–2004), first African-American female surgeon from the southeast United States
Edward L. Brown (1805–1876), American physician and politician
Emery N. Brown, American anesthesiologist
Ernest William Brown (1866–1938), British mathematician
George Williams Brown (1894–1963), Canadian historian and editor
Gordon Brown (born 1951), former Labour Prime Minister of the United Kingdom
Jason Walter Brown (born 1938), American neurologist
John Brown (physician, born 1735) (1735–1788), Scottish physician
John Brown (essayist) (1715–1766), English author
John Brown (physician, born 1810) (1810–1882), Scottish physician and essayist
John Ronald Brown (died 2010), famous for sex change surgeries
John Seely Brown, organizational studies researcher
Joseph Brown (artist) (1918–2009), Australian art collector; see Joseph Brown Collection
Michael Brown (historian) (born 1965), Scottish medievalist
Michael Glyn Brown (born 1957), former hand surgeon 
Michael L. Brown (born 1955), radio host, author, professor, theologian
Morton Brown (born 1931), American mathematician
Murray Brown (economist), Canadian professor of epidemiology
Patrick O. Brown (born 1954), American professor of biochemistry and genomics
Russell A. Brown, American physician and computer scientist
Thomas Brown (philosopher) (1778–1820), Scottish metaphysician